Karolina Arewång-Höjsgaard (born 12 March 1971) is a Swedish orienteering competitor.  She won the 2004 Long distance World Orienteering Championships, and has silver medals from 2003 (Long distance) and 2004 (Sprint). She is Relay World Champion from 2004, and has silver medals from 2003 and 2006, and a bronze medal from 2005, as member of the Swedish team.

Karolina Arewång-Höjsgaard is European Champion from 2004 (Relay). She won Tiomila in 2000, 2005 with her club Domnarvets GoIF.

References

External links
 
 

1971 births
Living people
Swedish orienteers
Female orienteers
Foot orienteers
World Orienteering Championships medalists
21st-century Swedish women
Junior World Orienteering Championships medalists